Grounds for Divorce or Grounds for Divorce: Love (German: Scheidungsgrund: Liebe) is a 1960 West German romantic comedy film directed by Cyril Frankel and starring O. W. Fischer, Dany Robin and Violetta Ferrari.

The film's sets were designed by the art directors Hans Jürgen Kiebach and Helmut Nentwig. It was made at the Spandau Studios in West Berlin.

Cast
O. W. Fischer as Dr. Thomas Werther
Dany Robin as Marylin
Violetta Ferrari as Lorelei Kindl
Alice Treff as Marylins Mutter Evelyn
Ernst Stankovski as Tullio
Heinrich Gretler as Richter
Ralf Wolter as Dr. Waldgeist
Peter W. Staub	
Bruno W. Pantel
Erich Poremski
Heinz Peter Scholz
Hugo Lindinger

References

External links

1960 comedy films
German romantic comedy films
West German films
Films directed by Cyril Frankel
Bavaria Film films
Films shot at Spandau Studios
1960s German films